Skyhouse is a 25-story rental apartment building located at 17th Avenue South and Broadway in Nashville, Tennessee. The building was developed jointly by Atlanta-based companies Novare Group and Batson-Cook Development, with Batson-Cook Construction as general contractor. There are 352 units with 10,600 sq ft of ground level retail space.

References

Buildings and structures in Nashville, Tennessee
Apartment buildings in Tennessee